Cesária Évora Airport (Portuguese Aeroporto Internacional Cesária Évora)  is Cape Verde's fourth-busiest airport (after Sal, Praia, and Boa Vista), located on the island of São Vicente, nearly  from the centre of Mindelo. It is located in the valley area in the west of the island and is north of the village of São Pedro.

History
The airport was constructed in 1959–1960. It was expanded to be able to host international flights between 2005 and 2009. The airport was officially renamed after the highly acclaimed singer Cesária Évora in 2012.

Airlines and destinations

Statistics
In 2017, the annual passenger number was 266,221, of which 82,892 on international flights. There were 5,146 air operations, of which 780 international.  of cargo were transported, of which 227 international.

Passengers

Busiest international routes

See also
List of airports in Cape Verde
Transport in São Vicente, Cape Verde
List of buildings and structures in São Vicente, Cape Verde

References

External links
 Cesária Évora International Airport
 TACV website

Airports in Cape Verde
Transport in São Vicente, Cape Verde